Douglas Zinkala (born 15 July 1944) is a Zambian long-distance runner. He competed in the marathon at the 1968 Summer Olympics.

References

1944 births
Living people
Athletes (track and field) at the 1968 Summer Olympics
Zambian male long-distance runners
Zambian male marathon runners
Olympic athletes of Zambia
Athletes (track and field) at the 1970 British Commonwealth Games
Commonwealth Games competitors for Zambia
Place of birth missing (living people)